Kelso Wash is an ephemeral stream in San Bernardino County, California, United States, that drains into Soda Lake .  The town of Kelso lies southeast of the wash .

Kelso Wash lies within the Mojave National Preserve. It originates at Cima, between the Kelso Mountains to the west and the Providence Mountains to the east as a southward flowing wash , where it receives the Cedar Wash from northeast and washes draining the Marl Mountains from northwest. The Cima Dome lies nearby. The area of Cima separates its valley from Ivanpah Valley . It then turns west north of the Kelso Dunes and receives first the Cottonwood Wash from southeast, which drains the southern Providence Mountains and the Granite Mountains , and then the Budweiser Wash from the south, which drains the Bristol Mountains, Granite Mountains and Old Dad Mountains. Kelso Wash then passes northwestward between Devils Playground to the north and Bristol Mountains to the south. It eventually ends into Soda Lake . It is the largest wash draining the area of Soda Lake.

Groundwater close to the surface and runoff sustain Kelso Wash. Dunes frequently blocked its course, impounding temporary lakes that filled with sediments during the early Holocene. The wash has cut as deep as  into the ground, and its course is flanked by river terraces. The Union Pacific Railroad closely parallels the wash .

Together with the Mojave River, it supplies water to the Mojave River sink area and Lake Tuendae . In 1984 Kelso Wash was proposed to be part of the source of sand for the Kelso Dunes .

References 

 
 
 
 
 

Mojave National Preserve
Rivers of San Bernardino County, California